Arslan Khan was the prince of the Karluks. Mongol emperor Genghis Khan commanded that Arslan Khan be given the title Sartaqtai, which was said to by synonymous with Tajik. It was also the name of one of the Khan's sons.

References

Nomadic groups in Eurasia
Turkic rulers